Beechwood is an unincorporated community in Ottawa County in the U.S. state of Michigan.  It is a census-designated place (CDP) for statistical purposes, but is not an incorporated municipality. The population was 3,121 at the 2020 census.

The CDP is considered to be part of the Holland urban area. It is located on the north shore of Lake Macatawa mostly within Holland Charter Township, although a small portion lies within Park Township.

Geography

Demographics

As of the census of 2000, there were 2,963 people, 1,107 households, and 770 families residing in the community. The racial makeup of the community was 86.84% White, 1.21% African American, 0.30% Native American, 4.25% Asian, 0.03% Pacific Islander, 5.50% from other races, and 1.86% from two or more races. Hispanic or Latino of any race were 13.47% of the population.

There were 1,107 households, out of which 36.3% had children under the age of 18 living with them, 57.1% were married couples living together, 8.3% had a female householder with no husband present, and 30.4% were non-families. 23.9% of all households were made up of individuals, and 6.9% had someone living alone who was 65 years of age or older.  The average household size was 2.67 and the average family size was 3.21.

In the community, the population was spread out, with 29.0% under the age of 18, 8.5% from 18 to 24, 33.5% from 25 to 44, 19.3% from 45 to 64, and 9.7% who were 65 years of age or older.  The median age was 33 years. For every 100 females, there were 104.2 males.  For every 100 females age 18 and over, there were 102.7 males.

The median income for a household in the community was $46,676, and the median income for a family was $56,087. Males had a median income of $37,000 versus $30,541 for females. The per capita income for the community was $22,968.  About 5.9% of families and 8.1% of the population were below the poverty line, including 15.2% of those under age 18 and 3.8% of those age 65 or over.

References

Unincorporated communities in Ottawa County, Michigan
Census-designated places in Michigan
Unincorporated communities in Michigan
Census-designated places in Ottawa County, Michigan